Eleanor Winifred Worthington Cox (born 21 June 2001) is an English actress from Merseyside best known for portraying Matilda Wormwood in Matilda the Musical for which 10-year-old Eleanor won a 2012 Laurence Olivier Award for Best Actress in a Leading Role in a Musical, becoming the youngest Olivier Award winner in any category at the time. She received a nomination for a British Academy Television Award for playing Janet Hodgson in The Enfield Haunting. She is also known for portraying Polly Renfrew in the CBBC TV adaptation of Jacqueline Wilson's Hetty Feather. She currently stars in the Sky Atlantic series Britannia.

Biography
From 2003, at the age of two, until 2012, Worthington Cox trained at the Formby School of Performing Arts.

Before starring in Matilda, Worthington Cox was in the chorus for a Bill Kenwright production of Joseph and the Amazing Technicolor Dreamcoat at the Liverpool Empire.

In September 2011, Worthington Cox was announced as one of four girls who would be playing the lead role of Matilda in Matilda the Musical along with: Cleo Demetriou; Kerry Ingram; and Sophia Kiely. She made her debut in October 2011 and performed in the show two nights a week. It was a critical success, and Matilda was nominated for 10 Olivier awards. Among the nominations was Best Actress in a Musical, for which Demetriou, Ingram, Kiely, and Cox were all nominated. On awards night, Matilda won seven out of the ten nominations. Cox won Best Actress in a Musical along with her co-stars and currently holds the record for the youngest winner of an Olivier award.

Worthington Cox continued to appear in Matilda until 19 August 2012, later sharing the role with Demetriou, Hayley Canham, Jade Marner, and Isobelle Molloy.

In May 2013, Worthington Cox played Scout in a stage production of To Kill a Mockingbird at Regent's Park Open Air Theatre, sharing her role with Lucy Hutchinson and Izzy Lee.

After finishing Matilda, Worthington Cox filmed the role of Young Princess Aurora in the film Maleficent (2014).

From April to August 2015, Worthington Cox played the role of Blousey Brown in a production of Bugsy Malone at the Lyric Hammersmith. This was the debut production following the theatre's reopening after a £16.5 million redevelopment project.

In October 2015, Worthington Cox played Jess in Tomcat, a new play by James Rushbrooke, at Southwark Playhouse, London.

In 2016, Worthington Cox received a British Academy Television Award nomination for her performance in the Sky One mini-series The Enfield Haunting. She was also featured as one of Screen International's "Stars of Tomorrow", the film magazine's annual showcase highlighting outstanding young actors from the UK and Ireland.

In 2018, Worthington Cox starred as Cait in Britannia.

Acting credits

Film

Television

Theatre

Accolades

See also
List of British actors

References

Bibliography
Sonia Friedman Productions Limited (2022). Jerusalem: Cast & Creative. Retrieved from Cast & Creative.

External links

2001 births
Living people
Laurence Olivier Award winners
People educated at Merchant Taylors' Girls' School
English child actresses
Actresses from Merseyside
English musical theatre actresses
21st-century English actresses